Parotis ankaratralis is a moth in the family Crambidae. It was described by Hubert Marion in 1954. It is found on the Comoros (Mohéli, Mayotte) and on Madagascar.

References

Moths described in 1954
Spilomelinae